Ažbe Jug (born 3 March 1992) is a Slovenian footballer who plays for Maribor as a goalkeeper.

Notes

References

External links
 NZS profile 
 

1992 births
Living people
Sportspeople from Maribor
Slovenian footballers
Association football goalkeepers
Slovenian PrvaLiga players
Slovenian Second League players
Championnat National 2 players
Ligue 1 players
Liga Portugal 2 players
NK IB 1975 Ljubljana players
FC Girondins de Bordeaux players
Sporting CP footballers
Fortuna Sittard players
NK Maribor players
Slovenian expatriate footballers
Slovenian expatriate sportspeople in France
Expatriate footballers in France
Slovenian expatriate sportspeople in Portugal
Expatriate footballers in Portugal
Slovenian expatriate sportspeople in the Netherlands
Expatriate footballers in the Netherlands
Slovenia youth international footballers
Slovenia under-21 international footballers